Aribo can refer to:

 Joe Aribo, footballer
 Arbeo of Freising (723–784), bishop of Freising, author
 Aribo of Austria (c. 850–909), margrave of the March of Pannonia
 Aribo of Leoben (fl. 904), count of Leobental
 Aribo I of Bavaria (d. 1001/1020), Count Palatine of Bavaria
 Aribo (Archbishop of Mainz) (d. 1031)
 Aribo II of Bavaria (1024–1102), Count Palatine of Bavaria
 Aribo Scholasticus, Benedictine monk and music theorist of the 11th century

See also
 Aribonids, noble family named after Aribo of Austria